Have Mercy is an American rock band from Baltimore, Maryland and are signed to RUDE RECORDS.

History
Have Mercy began in late 2009 after drummer Aaron Alt and guitarist Joey McCusker decided to disembark from their previous band. Looking for something different, following their formative years in the metal scene, they contacted long time friend Brian Swindle to head the group. Since then, they have released three albums, two EPs, and two splits. Their debut album, titled The Earth Pushed Back, was released in 2013 via Topshelf Records. Their second album, titled A Place of Our Own, was released in 2014 via Hopeless Records. They released their third album Make the Best of It on Hopeless Records on April 21, 2017.

On March 12, 2019, lead singer Brian Swindle announced that founding member and former drummer Aaron Alt had died. On December 18, 2019, the band announced their last tour via their social media accounts.

On January 2, 2022, the band teased a new EP via Instagram with a studio photo featuring frontman Brian Swindle former members Andrew Johnson, Todd Wallace, and Nick Woolford. On August 26, 2022, Have Mercy released a self-titled EP containing seven new songs.

Band members

Current Members 
Andrew Johnson - guitar, backing vocals <small>(2011-2017, 2022-present)
Brian Swindle – lead vocals, guitars, keyboards (2010–2020, 2022-present)
Todd Wallace - drums (2014-2017, 2022-present)
Nick Woolford - bass guitar, backing vocals (2011-2017, 2019-present)

Former Members 
Joey McCusker – lead guitar (2009–2012)
Aaron Alt – drums, percussion (2009–2014; died 2019)
Nate Gleason – guitar (2016–2019)

Discography
Studio albums
 The Earth Pushed Back (2013)
 A Place of Our Own (2014)
 Make The Best of It (2017)
 The Love Life (2019)

EPs
 Land of the Pleasant Living (2011)
 My Oldest Friend (2012)
 Untitled EP (2022)

Splits
You Blew It!, Dikembe, Have Mercy, Kittyhawk (2014)
Daisyhead, Have Mercy (2014)
Have Mercy, Somos (2015)

Videography
 "Howl" (2014) Directed by Mike Henneberger and Bowie Alexander
 "The Place You Love" (Live) (2015) Directed by Taylor Rambo
 "Two Years" (2015) Directed by Ryan Berger and Jesse Cornaglia
 "Coexist" (2017) Directed by Erik Rojas
 "Good Christian Man" (2017) Directed by Roland Bingaman
 "Reaper" (2017) Directed by Danielle Elise Bartley
 "Mattress On The Floor" (2019) Directed by Corrine McBreen
 "Heartbeat" (2019)
 "Dressed Down" (2019) Directed by Dan Schepleng

References

Musical groups from Baltimore
Topshelf Records artists
Musical groups established in 2010
2010 establishments in Maryland